Sundubu-jjigae (-豆腐--) is a jjigae in Korean cuisine. The dish is made with freshly curdled soft tofu (dubu) which has not been strained and pressed, vegetables, sometimes mushrooms, onion, optional seafood (commonly oysters, mussels, clams and shrimp), optional meat (commonly beef or pork), and gochujang or gochugaru. The dish is assembled and cooked directly in the serving vessel, which is traditionally made of thick, robust porcelain, but can also be ground out of solid stone. A raw egg can be put in the jjigae just before serving, and the dish is delivered while bubbling vigorously. It is typically eaten with a bowl of cooked white rice and several banchan.

Extra soft tofu, called sundubu ("mild tofu") in Korean, is softer than other types of tofu and is usually sold in tubes. The sun in sundubu means "pure" in Korean.

History
The origins of using unpressed tofu in Korean cuisine is not well documented, but records from the Joseon dynasty archives show an early form of sundubu jjigae being served. Some historians assume that unpressed tofu use spread to the masses during the Joseon dynasty.

Overseas
Following the Korean War, some American military servicemen who returned from South Korea brought home jjigae (especially dubu jjigae) recipes. In 1986, Monica Lee opened Beverly Soon Tofu in the Koreatown neighborhood of Los Angeles, and it was the first restaurant in the United States to specialize in sundubu jjigae. By the 1990s, sundubu jjigae restaurants were more popular throughout the United States. The dish became even more widely known when Hee Sook Lee, a first-generation Korean immigrant, opened her sundubu restaurant, BCD Tofu, in Vermont Avenue, Koreatown, and expanded it into a national chain. The chain was named after the “Bukchang Dong” district in Korea where Lee's mother-in-law owned a restaurant. In Canada, several BCD and other similar restaurants have been open in Toronto since 2001, and can also be found in other cities across the country. The North American version of the dish was eventually introduced back to South Korea due to its popularity.

See also

 Jjigae
 List of soups
 List of tofu dishes
 Korean cuisine

References

External links

 Recipe for Soondubu jjigae

Korean soups and stews
Tofu dishes
Seafood dishes